Leptodictya is a genus of lace bugs in the family Tingidae. There are at least 60 described species in Leptodictya.

Species
These 60 species belong to the genus Leptodictya:

 Leptodictya approximata (Stal, 1858)
 Leptodictya archboldi Froeschner, 1968
 Leptodictya austrina Drake & Hambleton, 1939
 Leptodictya bambusae Drake, 1918
 Leptodictya bredini Froeschner, 1968
 Leptodictya championi Drake, 1928
 Leptodictya circumcincta Champion, 1897
 Leptodictya colombiana Drake, 1928
 Leptodictya comes Drake & Hambleton, 1938
 Leptodictya comitis Drake & Hambleton, 1938
 Leptodictya cretata Champion, 1897
 Leptodictya decor Drake & Hambleton, 1945
 Leptodictya decoris Drake & Hambleton, 1945
 Leptodictya dilatata Monte, 1942
 Leptodictya dohrni (Stal, 1858)
 Leptodictya dola Drake & Hambleton, 1939
 Leptodictya ecuadoris Drake & Hambleton, 1945
 Leptodictya elitha Drake & Ruhoff, 1962
 Leptodictya evidens Drake, 1928
 Leptodictya faceta Monte, 1943
 Leptodictya formosatis Drake, 1928
 Leptodictya formositis Drake, 1928
 Leptodictya fraterna Monte, 1941
 Leptodictya fusca Drake
 Leptodictya fuscipes Froeschner, 1989
 Leptodictya fuscocincta (Stal, 1858)
 Leptodictya galerita Drake, 1942
 Leptodictya grandatis Drake, 1931
 Leptodictya intermedia Monte, 1943
 Leptodictya laidis Drake & Hambleton, 1945
 Leptodictya leinahoni (Kirkaldy, 1905)
 Leptodictya lepida (Stal, 1858)
 Leptodictya litigiosa Monte, 1940
 Leptodictya lucida Drake & Hambleton, 1945
 Leptodictya luculenta Drake, 1928
 Leptodictya ludica Drake & Hambleton
 Leptodictya madelinae Drake, 1928
 Leptodictya madra Drake & Hambleton, 1939
 Leptodictya nema Drake & Hambleton, 1939
 Leptodictya nicholi Drake, 1926
 Leptodictya nigra Monte, 1941
 Leptodictya nigrosis Drake & Hambleton, 1945
 Leptodictya nota Drake & Hambleton, 1939
 Leptodictya ochropa (Stal, 1858)
 Leptodictya olyrae Drake, 1931
 Leptodictya parilis Drake & Hambleton, 1945
 Leptodictya paspalii Drake & Hambleton, 1934
 Leptodictya paulana Drake & Hambleton, 1944
 Leptodictya perita Drake, 1935
 Leptodictya plana Heidemann, 1913
 Leptodictya simulans Heidemann, 1913
 Leptodictya sinaloana Drake, 1954
 Leptodictya socorrona Drake, 1948
 Leptodictya sodalatis Drake, 1928
 Leptodictya solita Drake & Hambleton, 1938
 Leptodictya tabida (Herrich-Schaeffer, 1840)
 Leptodictya tegeticula Monte, 1943
 Leptodictya venezolana Monte, 1940
 Leptodictya vulgata Drake, 1928
 Leptodictya williamsi Drake, 1928

References

Further reading

 
 
 
 

Tingidae
Articles created by Qbugbot